Ronald José Herrera Aular (born May 3, 1995) is a Venezuelan professional baseball pitcher in the Washington Nationals organization. He has previously played in Major League Baseball (MLB) for the New York Yankees.

Professional career

Oakland Athletics 
Herrera signed as an international free agent with the Oakland Athletics in December 2011. He made his professional debut in 2012 with the Rookie-level Dominican Summer League Athletics, going 2–4 with a 2.47 ERA in 58 innings. His 2013 season was split between the Rookie-level Arizona Athletics and the Class A Short Season Vermont Lake Monsters, accumulating a 7–4 record with a 4.02 ERA in 77 innings.

San Diego Padres 
In 2014, the Athletics traded Herrera and Jake Goebbert to the San Diego Padres for Kyle Blanks. He split that season between the Class A Beloit Snappers and the Class A Fort Wayne TinCaps, accumulating a 6–9 record with a 3.92 ERA in 132.1 innings. In 2015, he split the season between the Class A-Advanced Lake Elsinore Storm and the Double-A San Antonio Missions, accumulating a 8–7 record with a 4.08 ERA in 145.2 innings.

New York Yankees
After the 2015 season, the Yankees acquired Herrera from the Padres in exchange for José Pirela. His 2016 season was split between the Double-A Trenton Thunder, and the Triple-A Scranton/Wilkes-Barre RailRiders, accumulating a 10–8 record with a 3.94 ERA in 137 innings. On April 26, 2016, Herrera pitched eight innings of a joint no-hitter for the Trenton Thunder, with Jonathan Holder completing the game. 

The Yankees added him to their 40-man roster after the 2016 season. 

His 2017 season was split between the Rookie-level Gulf Coast Yankees, Trenton, and Scranton/Wilkes-Barre, accumulating a 8–1 record with a 1.91 ERA in 75 innings. He was named the Eastern League's Pitcher of the Week for June 5–11.

The Yankees promoted Herrera to the major leagues on June 14, 2017. He appeared in two major league games in 2017, recording a 0–1 record with a 6.00 ERA in 3 innings.

Texas Rangers
After the 2017 season, the Yankees traded Herrera to the Texas Rangers for Reiver Sanmartin. Herrera missed the 2018 season with a shoulder injury, and the Rangers outrighted him off their 40-man roster following the season. Herrera started the 2019 season on the injured list with the Triple-A Nashville Sounds as he recovered from shoulder surgery. He split the season between Nashville and the Frisco RoughRiders, going a combined 3–10 with a 7.73 ERA in 79 innings. He became a free agent following the 2019 season.

New Jersey Jackals
On March 2, 2021, Herrera signed with the New Jersey Jackals of the Frontier League.

Washington Nationals
On February 9, 2022, Herrera signed a minor league contract with the Washington Nationals organization. He elected free agency on November 10, 2022. On December 2, 2022, Herrera resigned a minor league contract with the Nationals.

References

External links

1995 births
Living people
Arizona League Athletics players
Beloit Snappers players
Dominican Summer League Athletics players
Venezuelan expatriate baseball players in the Dominican Republic
Fort Wayne TinCaps players
Frisco RoughRiders players
Lake Elsinore Storm players
Leones del Caracas players
Major League Baseball pitchers
Major League Baseball players from Venezuela
Nashville Sounds players
New Jersey Jackals players
New York Yankees players
Sportspeople from Maracay
San Antonio Missions players
Scranton/Wilkes-Barre RailRiders players
Trenton Thunder players
Venezuelan expatriate baseball players in the United States
Vermont Lake Monsters players